In music, Op. 125 stands for Opus number 125. Compositions that are assigned this number include:

 Beethoven – Symphony No. 9
 Prokofiev – Symphony-Concerto
 Reger – Eine romantische Suite
 Ries – Cello Sonata No. 4
 Schumann – 5 heitere Gesänge
 Straus II – Phönix-Schwingen